Ivan Švarný (born October 30, 1984) is a Slovak ice hockey player who is currently playing for HK Nitra of the Slovak Extraliga.

Career
He has previously played in the KHL for KHL Medveščak Zagreb and Dinamo Minsk. He played for the Slovakia men's national ice hockey team at the 2009 IIHF World Championship.

Career statistics

Regular season and playoffs

References

External links

1984 births
Living people
Sportspeople from Nitra
Belleville Bulls players
New Mexico Scorpions (CHL) players
HK Nitra players
HC Oceláři Třinec players
HC Dinamo Minsk players
HC Litvínov players
HC Slovan Bratislava players
HKM Zvolen players
KHL Medveščak Zagreb players
Oulun Kärpät players
Slovak ice hockey defencemen
Slovak expatriate ice hockey players in Canada
Slovak expatriate ice hockey players in the Czech Republic
Slovak expatriate ice hockey players in the United States
Slovak expatriate ice hockey players in Finland
Expatriate ice hockey players in Belarus
Expatriate ice hockey players in Croatia
Slovak expatriate sportspeople in Croatia
Slovak expatriate sportspeople in Belarus